Prithvipati Shah (?–1716) was the king of the Gorkha Kingdom in the South Asian subcontinent, present-day Nepal. He was the grandfather of Nara Bhupal Shah.

King Prithvipati Shah ascended to the throne after the demise of his father. He was the longest serving king of the Gorkha Kingdom but his reign saw a lot of struggles.

References

Gurkhas
1716 deaths
People from Gorkha District
17th-century Nepalese people
Nepalese Hindus